Barely Breaking Even (BBE) is a British record label started by two DJs, Peter Adarkwah and Ben Jolly.  The name BBE comes from The Universal Robot Band's 1982 track "Barely Breaking Even". It has two sublabels: Deep Funk, and Urban Theory. BBE is also notable for its Beat Generation series of LPs.

Current/former artists

BlackCoffee
Bombay Monkey
Dark Room Notes
J Dilla (deceased)
DJ Jazzy Jeff
George Pajon
Keb Darge
Keith Harris
Kenny 'Dope' Gonzales
Lady Daisey
Little Louie Vega
Masters at Work
Mike City
Mr Thing
Pete Rock
Phantogram
Printz Board
Roy Ayers
Shawn Lee
Slakah the Beatchild
DJ Spinna
Spoek Mathambo
TY
DJ Vadim
Paul Weller
will.i.am

Discography

Albums
1999: Keb Darge - Funk Spectrum: Real Funk for Real People
2003: Pete Rock - Lost & Found: Hip Hop Underground Soul Classics
2004: The Foreign Exchange - Connected
2004: Pete Rock - Soul Survivor II 
2005: Ski Oakenfull - Rising Son
2005: Pete Rock - The Surviving Elements: From Soul Survivor II Sessions
2005: D'Nell - 1st Magic
2005: Symbolyc One & Illmind - The Art of Onemind
2006: Shawn Lee - Soul Visa
2006: Nicolay - Here
2009: Notes to Self - A Shot in the Dark
2010: Ty - Special Kind of Fool
2010: Bara Bröst - Elephancycle
2010: Spoek Mathambo - Mshini Wam
2012: Newban - Newban and Newban 2
2014: Shawn Lee - Golden Age Against the Machine
2015: Dalindèo - Kallio
2016: Dalindèo - Slavic Souls
2017: Mike City - The Feel Good Agenda, Vol. 1

Beat Generation series
2001: J Dilla - Welcome 2 Detroit
2001: Pete Rock - Petestrumentals
2001: will.i.am - Lost Change
2001: Marley Marl - Re-Entry
2002: DJ Jazzy Jeff - The Magnificent
2002: King Britt - Adventures in Lo-Fi
2003: Larry Gold - Presents Don Cello and Friends
2003: DJ Spinna - Here to There
2004: The Beat Generation Sampler
2006: J Dilla - The Shining
2007: DJ Jazzy Jeff - The Return of the Magnificent
2008: Madlib - WLIB AM: King of the Wigflip

References

External links
 BBE Music
 
 Karizma BBE sampler
 Label Focus: BBE Music

British record labels
Hip hop record labels
British hip hop record labels
Electronic music record labels